Trailed by Three is a 1920 American silent Western film serial directed by Perry N. Vekroff. This is now considered to be a lost film.

Cast
 Stuart Holmes as Michael Casserly
 Frankie Mann as Jane Creighton
 Wilfred Lytell as Tom Carewe
 John Webb Dillion as Roscoe Trent
 John P. Wade as James Carewe
 William Welsh as Aboto
 Ruby Hoffman

See also
 List of film serials
 List of film serials by studio
 List of lost films

References

External links

 

1920 films
1920 lost films
1920 Western (genre) films
American silent serial films
American black-and-white films
Pathé Exchange film serials
Films directed by Perry N. Vekroff
Lost Western (genre) films
Lost American films
Silent American Western (genre) films
1920s American films